is a Japanese ex-child model-turned-actress, voice actress and singer. Her nickname is Rippi.

Biography

History
Iida came into the spotlight when she was 11 years old, appearing on the Tensai Terebi Kun MAX (天才てれびくんMAX) series on NHK Educational TV in 2002.  Since then she starred in many movies and TV series. She was also a model of a famous lolita gravure magazine Pure 2. She played the leading role in the film Shougaiken gibu no okurimono (障害犬ギブのおくりもの), which won a prize at the Japan Educational Film Festival. Her first photobook Pool (プール) in 2003 became the top-selling photobook in Japan.

She plays one of the main characters in the Love Live! School Idol Project anime and game project, Rin Hoshizora. The success of Love Live! contributed to an increase in exposure of her career. In 2014 she formed the duo group 4to6 with her co-star Pile (voice of Maki Nishikino). They released their first single in August 2014. She is a member of a mini unit in the Love Live! project, Lily White, alongside Aina Kusuda (voice of Nozomi Toujou) and Suzuko Mimori (voice of Umi Sonoda).

Her song  is used as the ending theme to the 2017 anime television series Digimon Universe: Appli Monsters. Her song  is used as the ending theme to the 2018 anime television series Boarding School Juliet.

She announced her marriage to a non-celebrity man on January 1, 2022.

Filmography

Films

TV series/TV movies

TV anime

Anime films

Web anime
Kaiju Girls (2016) as Aki Miyashita / Agira

Video games

Web Drama
Ultraman Orb: The Origin Saga (2017) as Pertel

Dubbing roles

Dubbing

Radio
Date unknown: Rippy Rainbow Party (リッピーレインボーパーティ）as NIKKEI (ラジオ)

Works

Photobooks/DVDs
2003: SWEET (SWEET 飯田里穂)
2003: Pool (プール―飯田里穂写真集) 
2004: Crawl (飯田里穂2nd写真集「クロール」) 
2004: Chiyohime Senmki (千代姫戦鬼)
2005: Photo Frame（フォトフレーム）
2006: En-Ei　(飯田里穂3rd写真集｢遠泳｣) 
2012: Kitto Zutto (きっと☆ずっと)

CDs
2002: Tentere neko damasii ～天てれ猫だましぃ～ MTK5th
2002: Tentere uta makura ～天てれ歌まくら～ MTK4th
2003: Go! Go! Tamagodon (Go!Go!たまご丼) 
2003: Tentere jou karubi ～天てれ上カルビ～ MTK6th 
2003: Tentere big bun ~MTK The7th ～天てれビッグバン～ 
2004: MTK the 8th 
2015: rippi-rippi 2015
2016: "KISS! KISS! KISS!" 2016
2016: 
2016: rippi‐holic 
2016:

Magazines
2002: Juvenile Vol.2 and 3
2002-2006: Pure 2 (pure☆pure) Vol.10~36

References

External links
Official web page
Fan site
Official site of agency
Official blog rippialoha
"Rippi Rainbow Party" official site (Japanese)

1991 births
Living people
Japanese voice actresses
Japanese child actresses
Japanese idols
Japanese television personalities
Voice actresses from Saitama (city)
Musicians from Saitama Prefecture
21st-century Japanese singers
21st-century Japanese women singers
21st-century Japanese actresses
Anime singers
Μ's members